Petros Matheus dos Santos Araújo (born 29 May 1989), simply known as Petros, is a Brazilian professional footballer who plays for Al-Fateh of Saudi Arabia mainly as a central midfielder.

Club career

Early career
Born in Juazeiro, Bahia, Petros graduated with Vitória's youth setup, and made his debuts while on loan at Democrata de Sete Lagoas in 2008. After another temporary spell at Rio Branco-ES in the following year, he signed for Fluminense de Feira on 29 December 2009.

In January 2012 Petros joined Juazeirense, but only days after, signed for Boa Esporte, as a clause on his contract allowed a free transfer to a club from Série A or Série B. He made his professional debut on 29 May, coming on as a half-time substitute in a 2–1 home win against Atlético Paranaense.

Petros scored his first professional goal on 10 July 2012, netting the last in a 3–4 away loss against Criciúma. He finished the campaign with 31 appearances and four goals, as his side narrowly avoided relegation.

On 17 December 2013 Petros signed for Penapolense.

Corinthians
On 5 April 2014, after impressing with Penapolense in 2014 Campeonato Paulista, Petros signed a one-year loan deal with Corinthians, with a buyout clause.

Petros made his debut on the main category of Brazilian football on 20 April 2014, starting in a 0–0 away draw against Atlético Mineiro. On 15 July he signed a new four-year contract with Timão, who bought 50% of his federative rights, being effective on 1 August; he scored his first goal in the category late in the month, netting the last in a 2–0 home win against fierce rivals Palmeiras.

On 10 August 2014, in a 1–0 win at Santos, Petros deliberately pushed the referee Raphael Claus. Initially being punished with a six-month suspension eight days later, his charge was reduced to three matches on 11 September.

Betis
On 22 June 2015 Petros signed a four-year contract with Real Betis, newly promoted to La Liga, for a rumoured €1.5 million fee, with the transfer being officially announced three days later.

Petros made his debut for the club on 29 August, replacing Alfred N'Diaye in a 0–5 away loss against Real Madrid. He scored his first goal abroad on 24 September, but in a 1–2 home loss against Deportivo de La Coruña.

São Paulo

On June 21, 2017, Betis accepted the offer from Tricolor for Petros. São Paulo bought 50% of Petros' rights, and he must come to Brazil, for signing his contract, on June 26. On June 29, Petros was appointed by the club. He said he is living the best moment of his career. Petros will wear the shirt number 6

Al-Nassr

On June 27, 2018, Al Nassr signed Brazilian midfielder Petros for two seasons by buying the player's card from Sao Paulo to represent Al Nassr from the new season  to represent Al Nassr from the new season of the Saudi Professional League, Al Nassr revealed in a tweet on his official account of the social networking site Twitter that the 29-year-old player was officially signed, accompanied by a welcome statement with his age and position on the pitch.

Career statistics

Honours 

Corinthians
Campeonato Brasileiro Série A: 2015

Al-Nassr
Saudi Professional League: 2018–19

References

External links
Kirin Soccer profile 

1989 births
Living people
Sportspeople from Bahia
Brazilian footballers
Association football midfielders
Campeonato Brasileiro Série A players
Campeonato Brasileiro Série B players
La Liga players
Saudi Professional League players
Esporte Clube Vitória players
Democrata Futebol Clube players
Rio Branco Atlético Clube players
Fluminense de Feira Futebol Clube players
Boa Esporte Clube players
Clube Atlético Penapolense players
Sport Club Corinthians Paulista players
Real Betis players
São Paulo FC players
Al Nassr FC players
Al-Fateh SC players
Brazilian expatriate footballers
Brazilian expatriate sportspeople in Spain
Expatriate footballers in Spain
Expatriate footballers in Saudi Arabia
Brazilian expatriate sportspeople in Saudi Arabia